Eetu Kostamo (9 December 1893 – 26 March 1971) was a Finnish gymnast. He competed in nine events at the 1924 Summer Olympics.

References

External links
 

1893 births
1971 deaths
Finnish male artistic gymnasts
Olympic gymnasts of Finland
Gymnasts at the 1924 Summer Olympics
Sportspeople from Leningrad Oblast
20th-century Finnish people